Fountain County Clerk's Building, also known as the Lew Wallace Law Office, is a historic government office building located at Covington, Fountain County, Indiana. It was built in 1842, and is a one-story, double pile, Federal style red brick building. It has a side gable roof and sits on a stone foundation.  The front facade features a nearly full-width front porch with decorative scrollwork.  It housed the office of the county clerk until 1859, when the building was sold and moved to its present location and the clerk's offices were moved to the third Fountain County Courthouse.  From 1849 to 1853, the building housed the law office of Lew Wallace (1827-1901).

It was listed on the National Register of Historic Places in 2002.

References

Government buildings on the National Register of Historic Places in Indiana
Federal architecture in Indiana
Government buildings completed in 1842
Buildings and structures in Fountain County, Indiana
National Register of Historic Places in Fountain County, Indiana
1842 establishments in Indiana
County government buildings in Indiana